In the Australian state of Western Australia, the Leader of the Opposition is the leader of the largest minority political party or coalition of parties in the Legislative Assembly of the Parliament of Western Australia.  By convention, the leader is generally a member of the Legislative Assembly.

Prior to 1911, the Western Australian political system had neither organised political parties (apart from the Labor Party) nor an organised opposition. The notion of leader of the opposition was well understood, however, and on occasions was applied to members. Maitland Brown, for example, was often referred to as "Leader of the Opposition" during his period as an outspoken critic of Governor Robinson's Government.

At the March 2021 election, the National Party, previously in the crossbench, won more seats than the previous opposition Liberal Party in the Legislative Assembly. It was likely that the National Party would become the official opposition, with advice from the solicitor-general stating that "the party with the most numbers in the Lower House must under the law become the opposition". In April 2021, the Liberal Party and Nationals Party entered into a formal alliance to form opposition, with National Party being the senior party and Liberal Party being the junior party in the alliance. The leader and deputy leader of the National Party, currently Mia Davies and Shane Love, would then be the Leader of the Opposition and Deputy Leader of the Opposition respectively.

List of leaders of the opposition

See also
 Premier of Western Australia

References

Western Australia

Western Australia-related lists